This is a partial list of notable people who have been claimed, either by themselves or by their followers, to be the reincarnation or incarnation of Jesus, or the Second Coming of Christ. Only people who have Wikipedia articles are listed.

17th century

 Rhys Evans, (1607 – c.1660) who later renamed himself 'Arise Evans' was a Welsh prophet who travelled to London to spread his premonitions. He was arrested and imprisoned around 1650 at Newgate Prison for impersonating Christ.

18th century
 Kondratiy Selivanov (c. 1730s–1832), the founder and leader of the Skoptsy sect in the Russian Empire. 
 Ann Lee (1736–1784), the founder and leader of the Shakers. Lee's followers referred to her as "Mother", believing that she was the female incarnation of Christ on Earth.

19th century

 John Nichols Thom (1799–1838), a Cornish tax rebel who claimed to be the "saviour of the world" and the reincarnation of Jesus Christ in 1834. He was killed by British soldiers at the Battle of Bossenden Wood, on 31 May 1838 in Kent, England.
 Arnold Potter (1804–1872), Schismatic Latter Day Saint leader; he claimed the spirit of Jesus Christ entered into his body and he became "Potter Christ" Son of the living God. He died in an attempt to "ascend into heaven" by jumping off a cliff. His body was later retrieved and buried by his followers.
 Bahá'u'lláh (1817–1892), born Shiite, adopted Bábism later in 1844; he claimed to be the prophesied fulfillment and Promised One of major religions including Hinduism, Judaism, Zoroastrianism, Buddhism, Christianity and Islam. He founded the Baháʼí Faith in 1863. The Baháʼís believe that the fulfillment of the prophecies of the second coming of Jesus, as well as the prophecies of the 5th Buddha Maitreya and many other religious prophecies, were begun by the Báb in 1844 and then by Bahá'u'lláh. They commonly compare the fulfillment of Christian prophecies to Jesus' fulfillment of Jewish prophecies, where in both cases people were expecting the literal fulfillment of apocalyptic statements.
 William W. Davies (1833–1906), leader of a Latter Day Saint schismatic group called the Kingdom of Heaven located in Walla Walla, Washington from 1867 to 1881. He taught his followers that he was the archangel Michael, who had previously lived as the biblical Adam, Abraham, and David. When his son Arthur was born on 11 February 1868, Davies declared that the infant was the reincarnated Jesus Christ. When Davies's second son, David, was born in 1869, he was declared to be God the Father.
 Mirza Ghulam Ahmad of Qadian, India (1835–1908), claimed to be the awaited Mahdi as well as the Second Coming and likeness of Jesus, the promised Messiah at the end of time. He claimed to be Jesus in the metaphorical sense; in character. He founded the Ahmadiyya Movement in 1889, envisioning it to be the rejuvenation of Islam, and claimed to be commissioned by God for the reformation of humankind.
 Cyrus Teed (1839–1908), American physician, claimed to be the incarnation of Jesus Christ and to have obtained knowledge regarding the Hollow Earth theory, presenting a cosmological model having the Earth as an inverted sphere and the remaining universe located within it.
 Carl Browne (1849–1914), American activist and leader of the Coxey's Army protest movement, claimed to be the partial reincarnation of Jesus.

20th century
 John Hugh Smyth-Pigott (1852–1927). Around 1890 Smyth-Pigott started leading meetings of the Agapemonite community and recruited 50 young female followers to supplement its aging population. He took Ruth Anne Preece as his second wife and she had three children named Glory, Power and Hallelujah. The house which may have belonged to Smyth-Pigott in St John's Wood was visited by John Betjeman in his film Metro-Land. It is built in the neo-gothic style. It is currently the home of the television presenter Vanessa Feltz and was previously the home of Charles Saatchi. Smyth-Pigott died in 1927 and the sect gradually declined until the last member, sister Ruth, died in 1956. Her funeral in 1956 was the only time when outsiders were admitted to the chapel.

 Haile Selassie I (1892–1975) did not claim to be Jesus and disapproved of claims that he was Jesus, but the Rastafari movement, which emerged in Jamaica during the 1930s, believes he is the Second Coming. He embodied this when he became Emperor of Ethiopia in 1930, perceived as confirmation of the return of the Messiah in the prophetic Book of Revelation  in the New Testament, who is also expected to return a second time to initiate the apocalyptic day of judgment. He is also called Jah Ras Tafari, and is often considered to be alive by Rastafari movement members.                                     
 Ernest Norman (1904–1971), an American electrical engineer who co-founded the Unarius Academy of Science in 1954, was allegedly Jesus in a past life and his earthly incarnation was as an archangel named Raphael. He claimed to be the reincarnation of other notable figures including Confucius, Mona Lisa, Benjamin Franklin, Socrates, Queen Elizabeth I, and Tsar Peter I the Great.

 Krishna Venta (1911–1958), born Francis Herman Pencovic in San Francisco, founded the WKFL (Wisdom, Knowledge, Faith and Love) Fountain of the World cult in Simi Valley, California in the late 1940s. In 1948 he stated that he was Christ, the new messiah and claimed to have led a convoy of rocket ships to Earth from the extinct planet Neophrates. He died on 10 December 1958, after being suicide-bombed by two disgruntled former followers who accused Venta of mishandling cult funds and having been intimate with their wives.
Jesu Oyingbo (1915–1988), a Nigerian man who proclaimed himself to be Jesus Christ returned.
 Ahn Sahng-hong (1918–1985), a South Korean who founded the World Mission Society Church of God in 1964, who recognize him as the Second Coming of Jesus. The World Mission Society Church of God teach that Zahng Gil-jah is "God the Mother", who they explain is referred to in the Bible as the New Jerusalem Mother (Galatians ), and that Ahn Sahng-Hong is God the Father.

 Sun Myung Moon (1920–2012), believed by members of the Unification Church to be the Messiah and the Second Coming of Christ, fulfilling Jesus' unfinished mission. Church members ("Unificationists") consider Sun Myung Moon and his wife, Hak Ja Han, to be the True Parents of humankind as the restored Adam and Eve.
 Anne Hamilton-Byrne (1921–2019) of The Family, born Evelyn Grace Victoria Edwards.
 Jim Jones (1931–1978), founder of Peoples Temple, which started off as an offshoot of a mainstream Protestant sect before becoming a personality cult as time went on. He claimed to be the reincarnation of Jesus, Akhenaten, the Buddha, Vladimir Lenin and Father Divine in the 1970s. He organized a mass murder suicide at Jonestown, Guyana on 18 November 1978. He shot himself after the murders were done.
 Marshall Applewhite (1931–1997), an American who posted a Usenet message declaring, "I, Jesus—Son of God—acknowledge on this date of September 25/26, 1995: ..." Applewhite and his Heaven's Gate religious group committed mass suicide on 26 March 1997, to rendezvous with what they thought was a spaceship hiding behind Comet Hale–Bopp.
 Charles Manson (1934–2017), American criminal, cult leader, and songwriter.
 Yahweh ben Yahweh (1935–2007), born as Hulon Mitchell Jr., a black nationalist and separatist who created the Nation of Yahweh in 1979 in Liberty City, Florida. His self-proclaimed name means "God, Son of God". He could have only been deeming himself to be "son of God", not God, but many of his followers clearly deem him to be God Incarnate. In 1992, he was convicted of conspiracy to commit murder and sentenced to 18 years in prison.
 Laszlo Toth (b. 1938), Hungarian-born Australian who claimed he was Jesus Christ as he vandalized Michelangelo's Pietà with a geologist's hammer in 1972.
 Wayne Bent (b. 1941), also known as Michael Travesser of the Lord Our Righteousness Church. He claims: "I am the embodiment of God. I am divinity and humanity combined." He was convicted on 15 December 2008, of one count of criminal sexual contact of a minor and two counts of contributing to the delinquency of a minor in 2008.
 Ariffin Mohammed (1943–2016), also known as "Ayah Pin", the founder of the banned Sky Kingdom in Malaysia in 1975. He claimed to have direct contact with the heavens and is believed by his followers to have been the incarnation of Jesus, as well as Shiva, and the Buddha, and Muhammad.
 Mitsuo Matayoshi (1944–2018) was a conservative Japanese politician, who in 1997 established the World Economic Community Party based on his conviction that he is God and Christ, renaming himself Iesu Matayoshi. According to his program he will do the Last Judgment as Christ but within the current political system.
 Tony Quinn (b. 1944), owned Yoga communes in 1970s Ireland where an orphan girl responsible for younger siblings endured a 40-day water-fast and ceased menstruation. He later created Educo which promoted the Ten percent of the brain myth and was rubbished by Professors of Psychology and Psychiatry in Ireland. It was found by the Eastern Caribbean Supreme Court that his allocation of shares in International Natural Energy was affirmed by a "clumsy forgery". An ex-follower sued Quinn for "assault and battery; allegedly obtaining money by false pretences; alleged fraudulent misrepresentation, intentional or careless infliction of mental suffering and suborning" in 2010.
 Hogen Fukunaga (b. 1945) founded Ho No Hana Sanpogyo, often called the "foot reading cult", in Japan in 1987 after an alleged spiritual event where he claimed to have realized he was the reincarnation of Jesus Christ and Gautama Buddha.
 José Luis de Jesús (1946–2013), Puerto Rican founder, leader and organizer of Growing in Grace based in Miami, Florida, who claimed that the resurrected Christ "integrated himself within me" in 2007.
 Inri Cristo (b. 1948), a Brazilian who claims to be the second Jesus reincarnated in 1969. Brasília is considered by Inri Cristo and his disciples as the New Jerusalem of the Apocalypse.
 Thomas Harrison Provenzano (1949–2000), an American convicted murderer who was possibly mentally ill. He compared his execution with Jesus Christ's crucifixion.
 David Icke (b. 1952), English former footballer and sports broadcaster, who said in a 1991 television interview with Terry Wogan that he was "the son of God".
Hasan Mezarcı (b. 1954) is a former politician and member of the Grand National Assembly of Turkey (1991–1995) who was expelled from the Welfare Party and imprisoned for his extreme view against secularism. He claimed to be Isa after his imprisonment.
 Shoko Asahara (1955–2018) founded the terrorist Japanese religious group Aum Shinrikyo in 1984. He declared himself Christ, Japan's only fully enlightened master and the Lamb of God. His purported mission was to take upon himself the sins of the world. He outlined a doomsday prophecy, which included a Third World War, and described a final conflict culminating in a nuclear Armageddon, borrowing the term from the Book of Revelation . Humanity would end, except for the elite few who joined Aum. The group gained international notoriety on 20 March 1995, when it carried out the sarin gas attack on the Tokyo subway. He was sentenced to death, and was executed on 6 July 2018.
 David Koresh (1959–1993), born Vernon Wayne Howell, was the leader of a Branch Davidian religious sect in Waco, Texas, though never directly claiming to be Jesus himself, proclaimed that he was the final prophet and "the Son of God, the Lamb" in 1983. In 1993, a raid by the U.S. BATF, and the subsequent siege by the FBI ended with Branch Davidian ranch burning to the ground. Koresh, 54 adults and 21 children were found dead after the fire extinguished itself.
 Marina Tsvigun (b. 1960), or Maria Devi Christos, is the leader of the Great White Brotherhood. In 1990 she met Yuri Krivonogov, the Great White Brotherhood founder, who recognized Marina as a new messiah and later married her, assuming in the sect the role of John the Baptist, subordinate to Tsvigun.
 Sergey Torop (b. 1961), a Russian former traffic cop who claims to be "reborn" as Vissarion, Jesus Christ returned, which makes him not "God" but the "Word of God". Also known as "Jesus of Siberia," Torop has an appearance similar to depictions of Jesus. He dresses in all white flowing robes and has long brown hair and a beard. Before claiming to be the Vissarion, Torop worked as a traffic policeman until he was fired in 1990. He founded the Church of the Last Testament and the spiritual community Ecopolis Tiberkul in Southern Siberia in 1990. The Church of the Last Testament has been described as being a mixture of beliefs from the Russian Orthodox Church, Buddhism, apocalypticism, collectivism, and with ecological values. The church currently resides on the largest religious reservation in the world in Siberian Taiga.

21st century

 Apollo Quiboloy (b. 1950) is the founder and leader of a Philippines-based Restorationist church, the Kingdom of Jesus Christ, The Name Above Every Name, Inc. He has made claims that he is the "Appointed Son of God".
 Alan John Miller (b. 1962), more commonly known as A.J. Miller, a former Jehovah's Witness Elder and current leader of the Australia-based Divine Truth movement. Miller claims to be Jesus Christ reincarnated with others in the 20th century to spread messages that he calls the "Divine Truth". He delivers these messages in seminars and various forms of media along with his current partner Mary Suzanne Luck, who identifies herself as the returned Mary Magdalene.
 David Shayler (b. 1965) is a former MI5 officer and whistleblower who, in the summer of 2007, proclaimed himself to be the Messiah. He has released a series of videos on YouTube claiming to be Jesus, although he has not built up any noticeable following since his claims.
 Maurice Clemmons (1972–2009), an American felon responsible for the 2009 murder of four police officers in Washington state, referred to himself in May 2009 as Jesus.
 Oscar Ramiro Ortega-Hernandez (b. 1990). In November 2011, he fired nine shots with a Romanian Cugir SA semi-automatic rifle at the White House in Washington D.C., believing himself to be Jesus Christ sent to kill U.S. President Barack Obama, whom he believed to be the antichrist.
 Todd Kincannon (b. 1981), former head of the South Carolina Republican Party, was arrested in 2018 for killing and mutilating his mother's dog. He claimed to police he was the second coming of Jesus Christ and that God had told him to do it, because “every 1,000 years there needs to be a sacrifice and blood must be spilt."
 Gabbie Hanna (b. 1991), an American Internet personality and singer-songwriter, went on a multi-post rant on TikTok in August 2022 claiming to be the second coming of Jesus.
 Ezra Miller (b. 1992), a non-binary American actor who allegedly referred to themself as Jesus, the Devil, and a Messiah to Native Americans and later claimed to be seeking mental help for same.

See also
 Cult of personality
 Doomsday cult
 God complex
 Hong Xiuquan claimed to be Jesus' little brother
 Jerusalem syndrome
 Jewish Messiah claimants
 List of avatar claimants
 List of Buddha claimants
 List of founders of religious traditions
 List of Mahdi claimants
 List of messiah claimants
 List of people who have been considered deities
 Messiah
 Messiah complex
 Messianism
 Religious delusion
 Unfulfilled Christian religious predictions

References

 
Christianity-related controversies
Christianity-related lists
Lists of religious figures
Jewish messiah claimants
Messianism